S. Mitra Kalita is a journalist, media executive and author of two books. Her first book 'Suburban Sahibs' is about how immigrants redefined New Jersey and thereby America and her second book 'My two Indias' is economic memoir about Globalization.

From July 2018 to 2020, she was Senior Vice President for News, Opinion and Programming at CNN Digital and was the Vice President for Programming at CNN Digital from June 2016 to July 2018. She has been on the board of The Philadelphia Inquirer since November 2020.

In 2020, Kalita started Epicenter-NYC, a newsletter to help New Yorkers get through the COVID-19 pandemic. She is also a 2021 Nieman Visiting Fellow at Harvard University.

Career
Mitra Kalita was the managing editor for editorial strategy at the Los Angeles Times from 2015 to 2016.

She went on to become the executive editor (at large) at Quartz after working as the founding ideas editor there. She helped launch Quartz India and Quartz Africa. She also worked at the Wall Street Journal where she directed coverage of the great recession  and helped launch Livemint, a business newspaper in New Delhi, India along with founding editor Raju Narisetti.

Personal life
Kalita was born in Brooklyn and was raised in Long Island, Puerto Rico, and New Jersey. She lives in Queens and has two daughters.

Books
 Suburban Sahibs Three Immigrant Families and Their Passage From India to America.

References

External links
S. Mitra Kalita on Twitter
Mitra Kalita website
Journalists profile of Mitra Kalita

American women journalists
CNN executives
Journalists from New York City
Living people
American people of Indian descent
Year of birth missing (living people)
American writers
The Wall Street Journal people
21st-century American women